Associazioni Calcio Riunite Messina S.r.l. is an Italian football club based in Messina, Sicily. It currently plays in Serie C.

History

Football in Messina 

The origins of the team go back to 1900, when Messina F.C. was founded in the city. The club has spent most of its existence in the lower Italian football leagues. They last competed in Serie B in 2007–08, which followed three consecutive seasons in Serie A. In July 2008, Messina were excluded from professional football due to financial issues, being later registered into amateur Serie D.

The farthest Messina has reached in the Coppa Italia is the last 16. This was achieved in the 2000s decade. In the past, they have also reached the semi-finals in the Coppa Italia Serie C.

Messina have appeared in the Italy's top league, Serie A, for a total of five seasons. The club's first spell in the league was in the 1960s; the second began in the 2000s decade. The highest ever position they have finished is 7th, which happened during the 2004–05 season.

From Messina F.C. to Giostra Messina (1900 to 1939) 
The history of Messina Football Club began when Alfredo Marangolo returned to Sicily in August 1900 from studying in London, England. In Great Britain the game of football was fast gathering popularity with The Football League in its early stages.

Messina Football Club were officially founded on 1 December 1900 by Marangolo with the help of Anglican reverend "Caulifield".

At the college where Marangolo visited he had also made the acquaintance of Ignazio Majo Pagano who formed Anglo Palermitan (Palermo) on his return, only a month before Messina. The first Sicilian derby was held between Messina and Palermo on 18 April 1901; 1,000 fans turned out to Via Notarbartolo for the match. The game ended 3–2 to the Palermitan side.

A strong bond and a healthy rivalry had built up between the two Sicilian clubs and a competition named the Whitaker Challenge Cup was arranged to be played between them. The first was held in 1905; Messina won another game (3–2) and captured their first trophy. Messina repeated the feat the following year at San Ranieri, capturing the trophy in a 2–1 victory.

The earthquake of 1908, which killed 60,000 people in Messina, later affected the club in a large manner; deaths included Charles Bousfield Huleatt, players Frank John Carter, Walter Oates and financial backer George H. Peirce. Football resumed in Messina the following year, thanks largely to Arthur Barret Lascelles who used his own money to ensure football activity in the city would continue. By 1910, the funds of Barret had dried up, and the club was folded, Società Ginnastica Garibaldi Messina (Gymnastic Society Garibaldi Messina) briefly took its place, until it too was dissolved due to the First World War.

After World War I, a club under the name US Messinese was founded and entered the following year's Coppa Federale Siciliana, an all Sicilian championship contested in Messina, Catania and Palermo. Messina finished as runners-up.

The club participated in the Italian Football Championship of 1921–22, organised by the C.C.I., finishing third in the Sicilian group section; this was the first championship in which clubs from the island were entered. The following season the FIGC and CCI were unified. This coincided with mergers in Messina, as another side, Umberto I Messina, was incorporated into US Messinese, and, therefore, the club changed its name to US Messinese Umberto I in October 1922. The following month this new side was fused again, this time with Messina Sporting Club; creating the Messina Football Club. Only two years later, in December 1924, FC Messina was melted, and the players became part of the reformed US Messinese.

Finally, Messinese qualified for the semi-finals of the International League, after beating Palermo, 3–0, in the Sicilian championship of 1924–25. Here, Messinese played against Alba Roma, Cavese and Liberty Bari, but failed to win a single match, scoring only two goals in six games. Messina would be promoted to Serie B for the 1932–33 campaign under the presidency of Francesco Lombardo and Koenig's coaching and remained in the league for six seasons. The spell in Serie B was also notable for the local rivalry between them and Calcio Catania.

.

From 1940 to 1947 
Down in Serie C, AC Messina were withdrawn and folded during 1940–41. The following season, in 1941–42, a club named US Peloro 1906 changed its name and became US Mario Passamonte (named after a fallen hero of the war in Africa). The idea was to enter the club into Serie C in place of Messina. However this was unsuccessful, until the following season.

It would not be long before all activity was halted in Italian football for World War II. After several mergers in 1945, including one between US Passamonte and AP Messina, the club AS Messina subsequently emerged as a post-war representative of Messina. This was not a clean cut merger. Some players and officials formed the rival club Giostra Messina. Both Giostra and AS Messina reached the finals of the Southern League but eventually finished fourth and fifth respectively.

A.C. Riunite Messina 
In 1947, the two teams AS Messina and Giostra Messina were united as one merged club Associazioni Calcio Riunite Messina, abbreviated as AC Riunite Messina.

The 1950s for Messina began in glorious fashion, they were crowned champions of Serie C under the management of Yugoslav manager Mihalj Balačić. Messina did not falter in Serie B. During their first season in the league they avoided relegation. Giuseppe Melazzo and the Comitato Reggenza owned the club during this new period of relative success. During the following season, Messina finished in third place.

Throughout the rest of the 1950s, Messina remained in the division as a whole finishing in a respectable position. Goffredo Muglia took over as president in 1958, to begin a brand new era for the club. For the first time in their history, Messina were crowned champions of Serie B during the 1962–63 season. The race for the championship was a very close one and went down to the last day of the season, with Messina finishing above Bari and Lazio.

For their first ever season in Serie A, the football squad for Messina included; Morelli, Brambilla, Stucchi, Pagani, Dotti, Peruvian Benitez, Ghelfi, Fascetti, Morbello, Canuti and Clerici. Messina's first game in Serie A took place on 15 September 1963. It ended in a 3–1 defeat against Sampdoria at Stadio Luigi Ferraris. As a whole, the first part of the season was not a success. They won only two games, but they managed to turn it around in the second half of the season with 7 wins, beating Juventus (1–0), Fiorentina (1–0) and Sampdoria (4–3). The surge of wins in the latter part of the season helped them stay up, finishing 14th.

The next season for the club in Serie A would not be so fortunate. They were relegated in 17th place. Some notable high points of the season included a 1–0 victory over Roma at the Stadio Olimpico. A team from Rome would also be the opposition for Messina's other most impressive result of the season. They stunned Lazio, beating them, 4–0, on the last day of the season.

The Sicilian side were not able to bounce straight back up into Serie A, and, in fact, after their third season back down in Serie B were relegated. After several seasons finishing in and around the top 10 positions of Serie C, Messina were relegated down to Serie D in the 1972–73 season. The club managed to bounce straight back, winning the Serie D championship and achieving promotion back into C. After a few decent seasons in the upper parts of the table, relegation struck Messina again. In the 1979 season Serie C2 was formed and Messina were placed into it.

By 1983, Messina were champions of Serie C2 and had a future star amongst their ranks in Salvatore Schillaci. The club, now back on the right track, came close to promotion to Serie B in 1985 with a third-place finish just behind Palermo, and won Serie C1 and earned themselves promotion back to Serie B the following season.

Time in Serie B during the 1980s, was a pleasant one for the Sicilian side. They notched seventh and eighth-place finishes. In 1989, Schillaci was sold to Turin giants Juventus, and, just three seasons after Schillaci's departure, Messina lost their position in Serie B and were relegated down to C1 and then spiraled into further trouble. The club finished 12th in Serie C1 in the 1992–93 season, but, due to financial difficulties, the FIGC cancelled all professional football activity for Messina.

In 1993, it was included to Sicilian Promozione, and in 1994, it was admitted in Sicilian Eccellenza. In this league the club has played until 1998, when following the relegation in Sicilian Promozione, it was dissolved.

A.S. Messina 
The decision was thought to be unjust by the club and fans, with Messina been thrown into a footballing abyss never known before. In the summer of 1993, A.S. Messina was founded with the president Pietro La Malfa, beginning in the amateurs national championship (C.N.D.) with the objective to bring back the giallorossi to professional football.

They played in the Campionato Nazionale Dilettanti for four seasons, finishing high up for the first three of them, but in the 1996–97 season, they were ranked last and relegated to the Sicilian Eccellenza league.

In the 1998–99 season, they were relegated to Sicilian Promozione and were dissolved.

From U.S. Peloro to F.C. Messina Peloro 
In the summer of 1994, after the merger of Villafranca and Tremestieri, U.S. Peloro was founded. It played two seasons in Eccellenza Sicily, and in 1996, it was promoted to Campionato Nazionale Dilettanti (Serie D). Then, in the 1996 season, the club  played in the same league as the town's other team, A.S. Messina, where it was ranked 6th.

In July 1997, the club changed its name to Football Club Messina Peloro. In a few short seasons, the club ramped up the Italian league system, from Campionato Nazionale Dilettanti in the 1997–98 season, Messina were promoted into Serie C2 as champions. Promoted to Serie C1 in 2000, they immediately managed to fight hard for a promotion spot back to Serie B, winning promotion to Calcio Catania after play-offs. In less than a decade, under the presidency of Aliotta, Messina had climbed back up from the abyss and were back in the upper part of the Italian league system.

After two seasons in Serie B, local entrepreneur Pietro Franza took over, and in 2003–04, Sicily returned into Serie A under coach Bortolo Mutti. The club had not appeared in the top Italian league since 1965, a total of forty years.

After being tipped as underdogs in Serie A for the 2004–05 season, Messina surprised doubters by producing several good results including defeating both of the Milanese clubs, beating AC Milan first at San Siro 2–1, and then later in the season also with Internazionale, this time at home, for the first time in their history; the winning goal was struck by Rafael in the third minute of injury time.

Messina managed to stay clear of relegation throughout the whole season, and eventually finished in seventh place in the table, just a single place away from securing a UEFA Cup place. Also during this period, for the first time in the club's history, Messina players were called up in the Italy national football team: first was Alessandro Parisi in 2004, then Carmine Coppola in 2005 who was called up twice by the azzurri.

Despite this impressive form, Messina were still in danger of being relegated from Serie A at the end of the season, due to a possibility of not having enough finances available to compete in the league. Eventually, though, they successfully managed to stay in the Serie A league. In the 2005–06 season, Messina were unable to repeat their previous impressive season, leading to the sacking of Mutti, who was replaced by Giampiero Ventura. Despite all, they looked to be mathematically relegated from the top division after Day 36. losing the derby against Reggina, 3–0. However, due to the Serie A scandal of 2006, Messina avoided relegation to Serie B despite finishing 18th.

Messina started the 2006–07 season with Bruno Giordano as head coach; however, he was replaced on 30 January 2007, by Alberto Cavasin because of poor results. On 2 April, following a 2–0 away defeat to Cagliari, another team involved in the battle to avoid relegation, Cavasin was sacked, and Giordano was recalled to fill the coaching position. Giordano's record was even worse in his second time at Messina, with four defeats in four matches. With Messina second-last placed in the table five matchdays prior to the end of the season, Giordano was sacked again on 23 April, and replaced by Bruno Bolchi. Messina were relegated at the end of the season.

After a quiet Serie B season in 2007–08, in July 2008 Messina chairman Pietro Franza announced he did not find any investor ready to take over the club and that he was consequently giving up the club's Serie B membership, declaring that he would look forward to enter the club into an amateur league. On 1 August, it was confirmed that Messina was admitted to Serie D. In November 2008, the Court of Messina declared the club to be bankrupt and appointed a trustee to start a search for potential investors.

A.C. Rinascita Messina 

In March 2009, Rome-based entrepreneur Alfredo Di Lullo acquired Football Club Messina Peloro in a blind auction held by the Court of Messina in April 2009. The club was renamed A.C. Rinascita Messina (rinascita means "revived"). On 4 January 2011, the club was transferred to the group Martorano which on 14 August 2011, sold it to Raffaele "Lello" Manfredi.

In June 2012, the club was acquired by a consortium led by prominent football manager Pietro Lo Monaco, former managing director at Serie A club Catania and one of the masterminds behind the club's rise into top flight in the 2000s. Messina finished 4th in Group I and qualified to the promotion playoffs in the 2011–12 season. It eliminated Battipagliese by a score of 3–1 in the first round but was eliminated by Cosenza by a score of 3–0 in the second round. Messina finally became champions of Group I of Serie D and were promoted to Lega Pro Seconda Divisione, the fourth level of the Italian league. After winning the Lega Pro Seconda Divisione/B title, the club was then admitted to play in the unified 2014–15 Lega Pro season.

A.C. Riunite Messina 
Since the summer of 2014, the new name of the club is Associazioni Calcio Riunite Messina. In the 2014–15 season, the club was relegated to Serie D, but it was readmitted to Lega Pro for involvement in sporting fraud. Since the summer of 2015, the new owner and president is Natale Stracuzzi. The club failed to submit its surety by the 5 July 2017 deadline and was expelled by Lega Pro. A successor club, A.C.R. Messina S.s.d. a r.l. was admitted to the 2017–18 Serie D.

Rivalries 
Messina's biggest rivals are Reggina, located on the mainland, due to their close proximity and matches are known as Derby dello Stretto ("Derby of the Strait") as Messina and Reggio Calabria are separated by the Strait of Messina. Catania S.S.D and Palermo F.C (“Derby of the Sicily”)

Colors and badge 
Its colours are yellow and red.

Current squad

Out on loan

Notable players 

  Salvatore Aronica
  Emanuele Curcio
  Julio César de León
  Arturo Di Napoli
  Dimitrios Eleftheropoulos
  Antonio Nocerino
  Alessandro Parisi
  Igor Protti
  Rahman Rezaei
  Christian Riganò
  Salvatore Schillaci
  Marco Storari
  Salvatore Sullo
  Atsushi Yanagisawa
  Riccardo Zampagna
  Marco Zoro

Stadium 

The former club Football Club Messina Peloro have played their home matches in the new Stadio Comunale San Filippo since the 2004–05 to 2008–09 season. Since the season 2009–10 plays here the current team of A.C. Riunite Messina 1947.

The capacity of the stadium is 37,895 seats. It is named after the part of the city in which it is located, but a couple of petitions aim to rename it after the former Messina manager Franco Scoglio or the Messina Saint Hannibal Mary Di Francia.

The old stadium, the 11,000 seater Stadio Comunale Giovanni Celeste, is now used by S.S.D. Città di Messina, the second team of the city.

Honours 
Serie B
1 Champions: 1962–63

Serie C
2 Champion : 1949–50, 1985–86

Serie C2
3 Champions: 1982–83, 1999–00, 2013–14
Serie D
3 Champions: 1973–74 (Group I), 2012–13 (Group I), 2020-21 (Group I)

Campionato Nazionale Dilettanti
1 Champion : 1997–98

Sicilian Championship
1 Winners: 1924–25

Whitaker Challenge Cup
2 Winners: 1905, 1906

References

External links 
Official twitter
facebook
instagram

 
Football clubs in Italy
Football clubs in Sicily
Association football clubs established in 1900
Sport in Messina
Serie C clubs
1900 establishments in Italy
Phoenix clubs (association football)